Alpha Xi Delta Women's Fraternity consists of 134 active chapters and 2 planned future colonies. There are a total of 220 chapters ever chartered.

Chapters

United States
Inactive chapters are in dark grey rows.

Planned colonies
Colonization dates are subject to change.

References

Alpha Xi Delta
chapters